Cyril Brien Dennis Parker (6 May 1897 – 21 December 1962) was an Irish first-class cricketer.

Born at Rathgar near Dublin, Parker made a single appearance in first-class cricket for Dublin University against Essex at Brentwood during Dublin University's tour 1922 tour of England. Batting twice during the match, Parker was dismissed for 27 runs in Ireland's first-innings by Joseph Dixon, while in their second-innings he was dismissed again by the same bowler for 13 runs.

References

External links

1897 births
1962 deaths
Cricketers from Dublin (city)
Irish cricketers
Dublin University cricketers